Melanoleuca verrucipes is a species of fungus in the family Tricholomataceae. It is described as being a "very distinct species with its blackish dotted stipe." It was reportedly first discovered on leaf mulch in Highgate Woods, north London. The edibility of the mushroom is not known with certainty.

References

Tricholomataceae
Fungi of Europe
Fungi described in 1872